Reston is an English surname. Notable people with the surname include:

Agnes Reston (1771–1856), Scottish wartime nurse during the Peninsular War
Ana Carolina Reston (1985–2006), Brazilian fashion model
Arloa Reston (born 1978), American actress
James Reston (1909–1995), American journalist
James Reston, Jr. (born 1941), American author and journalist
Thelma Reston (1937–2012), Brazilian actress

Fictional characters:
Clive Reston, a character in the Marvel Comics Universe

English-language surnames